Mostafa Keshvari is an  Iranian-born Canadian filmmaker and screenwriter. In 2022, he was listed as a finalist for the Top 25 Canadian Immigrant Awards.

Career 
Keshvari started his film directing career in 2015. His first featured film Unmasked won numerous awards at international film festivals. The film is about a young Muslim immigrant woman secretly joins an acting class.His debut short film I Ran was selected in 2015 Cannes Short Film Corner.Keshvari′s film, Child Bride was premiered at the 2019 Cannes Film Festival.
  Keshvari directed the film Corona during the COVID-19 pandemic. The film received international attention for reportedly being the first feature film about the COVID-19 pandemic. Keshvari directed Eternal Igloo, an animated short film, released in 2021. The film won Golden Sheaf Award for Best Multicultural Film at the Yorkton Film Festival in 2021.
 The film received Best Sound Award, Best Musical Score Award and was nominated for Best Art Direction award at the 2021 Leo Awards. It also won the Best International Short Film Awards at Oakville Festivals of Film and Art.

Selected filmography

Director, writer and producer 
 Eternal Igloo  (2021)
 Corona (2020)
 The Will and the Wall (Short) (2020)
 Color-blind (2020)
 Child Bride (Short) (2020)
 One Journey (Short) (2018) 
 Unmasked (2018)
 Music Box (2018)
 Dream of a Paper plane (Short), (2016)
 Modern Monk (Documentary) (2017)
 I Ran (Short) (2015)

References

External links 
 

Canadian film directors
Iranian film directors
Year of birth missing (living people)
Living people
Iranian emigrants to Canada